Corinne Vignon (born 10 June 1963) is a French politician of La République En Marche! (LREM) who has been serving as a member of the French National Assembly since the 2017 elections, representing the 3rd constituency of Haute-Garonne.

In parliament, Vignon serves on the Committee on Social Affairs. She also chairs of a cross-party working group on pension reform. Since 2020, she has been serving as her parliamentary group's co-rapporteur on the government's pension reform plans, alongside Guillaume Gouffier-Cha, Jacques Maire and Carole Grandjean.

In addition to her committee assignments, Vignon is a member of the French-Mexican Parliamentary Friendship Group.

See also
 2017 French legislative election

References

1963 births
Living people
Deputies of the 15th National Assembly of the French Fifth Republic
La République En Marche! politicians
21st-century French women politicians
People from Agen
Politicians from Nouvelle-Aquitaine
Women members of the National Assembly (France)
Members of Parliament for Haute-Garonne
Deputies of the 16th National Assembly of the French Fifth Republic